Katyr-Yurt (Kotar-Yurt) is a rural locality (a selo) in Achkhoy-Martanovsky District, Chechnya.

Administrative and municipal status 
Municipally, Katyr-Yurt is incorporated as Katyr-Yurtovskoye rural settlement. It is the administrative center of the municipality and is the only settlement included in it.

Geography 

Katyr-Yurt is located between the Netkhoy and Shalazha rivers.

The nearest settlements to Katyr-Yurt are Shaami-Yurt and Valerik in the north-east, Gekhi in the east, Gekhi-Chu in the south-east, Shalazhi in the south, Yandi in the south-west, Bamut in the west, and Achkhoy-Martan in the north-west.

History 
In 1944, after the genocide and deportation of the Chechen and Ingush people and the Chechen-Ingush ASSR was abolished, the village of Katyr-Yurt was renamed to Tutovo, and settled by people from other ethnic groups. From 1944 to 1957, it was a part of the Novoselsky District of Grozny Oblast.

In 1958, after the Vaynakh people returned and the Chechen-Ingush ASSR was restored, the village regained its old name, Katyr-Yurt.

Katyr-Yurt in the Chechen Wars 
From 4 February 2000 to 7 February 2000, during the closing stages of the Second Chechen War, Russian aircraft launched several bomb attacks against the village of Katyr-Yurt. While the intended target was said to be militants who were passing through the village, the vast majority of the victims were civilians. Atleast 363 civilians were killed in the attack.  On 2 December 2010, the European Court of Human Rights ordered Russia to pay €1,720,000 to the victims of the bomb attack on Katyr-Yurt, in compensation to 29 applicants for their injuries or the death of their loved ones.

Population 
 1979 Census: 6,120
 1990 Census: 7,562
 2002 Census: 9,182
 2010 Census: 12,806
 2019 estimate: 14,556
 2022 estimate: 34,861

According to the results of the 2010 Census, the majority of residents of Katyr-Yurt were ethnic Chechens.

References 

Rural localities in Achkhoy-Martanovsky District